The Franklin D. Roosevelt Presidential Library and Museum holds the records of Franklin Delano Roosevelt, the 32nd president of the United States (1933–1945). Located on the grounds of Springwood, the Roosevelt family estate in Hyde Park, New York, the library was built under the President's personal direction in 1939–1940, and dedicated on June 30, 1941. It is the first presidential library in the United States and one of the thirteen presidential libraries under the auspices of the National Archives and Records Administration.

History
The library resulted from the President's decision that a separate facility was needed to house the vast quantity of historical papers, books, and memorabilia he had accumulated during a lifetime of public service and private collecting.

Margaret Suckley, who acted as Roosevelt's personal archivist during his life, was involved in the establishment of the library and served as its archivist for its first two decades.

Before the library
Prior to Roosevelt's Presidency, the final disposition of Presidential papers was left to chance. Although a valued part of the nation's heritage, the papers of chief executives were private property which they took with them upon leaving office. Some were sold or destroyed and thus either scattered or lost to the nation forever. Others remained with families, but inaccessible to scholars for long periods of time. The fortunate collections found their way into the Library of Congress and private repositories.

Roosevelt was the first to make his papers available to the public by donating them to the government. In erecting his library, Roosevelt created an institution to preserve intact all his papers. These included papers from all his political offices, New York state senator (1911–13), assistant secretary of the Navy (1913–20), governor of New York (1929–32), and President of the United States (1933–45) and his private collections of papers, books, and memorabilia on the history of the U.S. Navy and Dutchess County, New York.

Location and buildings

The Library was overcrowded when finished, because Roosevelt did not expect to serve as president for more than two terms. A 1950 estimate stated that the library contained 50 million items, including 16,000 books, 15,000 photographs, 275,000 feet of movie film, and 300 sound recordings. The building is built of Hudson Valley fieldstone in the style reminiscent of the local Dutch colonial architecture which he favored. A sketch made by President Roosevelt dated April 12, 1937, shows the proposed building placed on the grounds very close to the site ultimately chosen and a ground plan roughly approximating that of the main block today. Based on his sketches, the building was designed by principal architect Louis A. Simon and consulting architect Henry J. Toombs. He built it with privately donated funds, at a cost of $376,000 and then turned it over to the federal government on July 4, 1940, to be operated by the National Archives. By his actions, Roosevelt ensured that his papers would become the property of the nation and be housed in a library on the grounds of his Hyde Park estate where they would be available to scholars. Robert D.W. Connor, the first Archivist of the United States, said of the President, "Franklin D. Roosevelt is the nation's answer to the historian's prayer."

On June 30, 2013, the library building reopened to the public after a multi-million dollar renovation that was  funded through both public funds and private donations. This was the first full-scale renovation since Roosevelt himself opened the library, with expanded exhibit space, HVAC updates, and research room improvements.  Members of the Roosevelt family and the historian Geoffrey Ward spoke at a rededication ceremony that day.

In July 2015, Archivist of the United States David Ferriero appointed Paul M. Sparrow to be the new director of the FDR Library and Museum.

Other archives
In early planning for the library the President expressed the hope that Eleanor Roosevelt's papers would eventually find a place here. In 1942 President Roosevelt made a rough sketch for wings to be added on to the north and south sides of the building should additional space be needed for her papers. At the time of her death in 1962 Mrs. Roosevelt's papers totaled three million pages.

During her tenure at the library (1961–1969), Elizabeth B. Drewry raised funds for the wings to house Eleanor Roosevelt's papers. Construction was completed in 1972.

The library contains the donated papers of others associated with Roosevelt, such as Henry Morgenthau, Jr.'s diary of 840 volumes.

Presidential Libraries Act

Roosevelt's actions served as a precedent. When Congress passed the Presidential Libraries Act in 1955, it regularized the procedures initiated by President Roosevelt for privately built and federally maintained libraries to preserve the papers of future Presidents; all of the Presidents from Herbert Hoover to George W. Bush have a presidential center overseen by the National Archives. Even though official presidential papers are now public property as a result of the Presidential Records Act of 1978, and there is legislation limiting the size and financing of museums, Roosevelt's original intentions of preserving papers in one place and making them accessible to the nation still hold true.

Museum

Roosevelt hoped the library would become an important research center and attract visitors to the museum. The museum section of the building opened June 30, 1941. However, the onset of World War II changed Roosevelt's plans, and the official opening of the library as a research facility was deferred as the President served a third term and then was elected to a fourth term in 1944. He visited the library often during the war to sort and classify his records and memorabilia; and from his study in the library he delivered several of his famous radio speeches or "fireside chats".

President Roosevelt paid his last visit to Hyde Park in March 1945 and died on April 12 at Warm Springs, Georgia, at the age of sixty-three.

See also
 Presidential memorials in the United States

References

External links

 Franklin D. Roosevelt Presidential Library
 Roosevelt and His Library, part 1
 Roosevelt and His Library, part 2
 FDR, His Library, and the National Archives
"Life Portrait of Franklin D. Roosevelt", from C-SPAN's American Presidents: Life Portraits, broadcast from the home of Franklin D. Roosevelt National Historic Site and the Franklin D. Roosevelt Presidential Library and Museum, October 11, 1999

Franklin D. Roosevelt
Houses in Hyde Park, New York
Library buildings completed in 1940
Libraries in New York (state)
Museums in Hyde Park, New York
Roosevelt, Franklin D.
Presidential museums in New York (state)
U.S. Route 9
Monuments and memorials to Franklin D. Roosevelt in the United States